Alberto "Albertino" Bigon (born 31 October 1947) is an Italian football manager and former player, who played as a midfielder or forward.

Playing career

Born in Padua, Bigon started his playing career for his native city team Padova. He made his Serie A debut with SPAL in 1967, but obtained most of his playing triumphs with A.C. Milan, where he played from 1971 to 1980. He appeared in 218 league matches with A.C. Milan, scoring 56 goals and winning a Serie A championship in 1979, as well as three Coppa Italia tournaments (1972, 1973, 1977) and a Cup Winners' Cup (1973). He also served as Milan's captain. Bigon retired from playing football in 1984, after two two-year spells with Lazio and Vicenza.

Style of play
Bigon was a tactically intelligent attacking midfielder, with a slender physique and an eye for goal, who was also capable of playing as a forward.

Coaching career
Bigon coached his first team, Reggina, in 1986–1987, then Cesena, in 1987. He coached Cesena until 1989, when he left to coach Napoli, then led by Diego Maradona. He immediately won a Serie A championship, the second in Napoli's history. He then won the Italian Super Cup the same year. He left the club in 1991, after a poor eighth place followed by Maradona's forced farewell to Napoli. He then coached minor clubs such as Lecce (Serie B), Udinese (Serie A, saved from relegation after playoffs) and Ascoli (Serie B). In 1996, he was appointed coach of Swiss team FC Sion, which he led to win Swiss Super League for its second time in history. Bigon then tried an unsuccessful return to Serie A with Perugia. In November 1999 he was appointed coach of Greek club Olympiacos, but was dismissed on 10 April 2000 despite the first place in the championship table.

After seven years without a job, Bigon made a comeback to football in February 2007, when he was appointed coach of FC Sion, a team he already managed years before.

In August 2008, he became head coach of Slovenian football team Interblock Ljubljana. However, this experience lasted only a very short time, as Bigon left the club in September 2008 by mutual consent with the club due to personal health issues.

Honours

Player
Milan
Serie A: 1978–79
Coppa Italia: 1971–72, 1972–73, 1976–77
European Cup Winners' Cup: 1972–73

Coach
Napoli
Serie A: 1989–90
Supercoppa Italiana: 1990

Sion
Swiss Super League: 1996–97
Swiss Cup: 1997
Olympakos
Alpha Ethniki: 1999–2000

Individual
Special Panchina d'oro: 1997
A.C. Milan Hall of Fame

References

1947 births
Living people
Sportspeople from Padua
Association football midfielders
Association football forwards
Italian footballers
Italian football managers
S.S.C. Napoli players
Calcio Padova players
S.P.A.L. players
Calcio Foggia 1920 players
A.C. Milan players
S.S. Lazio players
L.R. Vicenza players
Serie A players
Serie B players
Serie C players
A.C. Cesena managers
S.S.C. Napoli managers
U.S. Lecce managers
Udinese Calcio managers
Ascoli Calcio 1898 F.C. managers
Olympiacos F.C. managers
A.C. Perugia Calcio managers
Reggina 1914 managers
FC Sion managers
NK IB 1975 Ljubljana managers
Footballers from Veneto